The 1989–90 NBA season was the Bucks' 22nd season in the National Basketball Association. For the first time since the 1978–79 season, Sidney Moncrief was not on the team's opening day roster. During the off-season, the Bucks acquired All-Star guard Alvin Robertson and Greg Anderson from the San Antonio Spurs. Early into the season, the Bucks defeated the Seattle SuperSonics in a quintuple-overtime game on November 9, 155–154 at the Bradley Center. The team held a 27–22 record at the All-Star break. At midseason, the team traded Randy Breuer to the expansion Minnesota Timberwolves in exchange for Brad Lohaus. The Bucks finished third in the Central Division with a 44–38 record.

Ricky Pierce led the team in scoring, averaging 23.0 points per game off the bench, and was named Sixth Man of the Year, despite only playing 59 games due to a wrist injury, while Jay Humphries averaged 15.3 points, 5.8 assists and 1.9 steals per game, and Robertson provided the team with 14.2 points, 6.9 rebounds, 5.5 assists and 2.6 steals per game, and was named to the NBA All-Defensive Second Team. In addition, Jack Sikma provided with 13.9 points and 6.9 rebounds per game, while Paul Pressey contributed 11.0 points per game off the bench, and Fred Roberts averaged 10.5 points per game.

However, in the Eastern Conference First Round of the playoffs, the Bucks lost to Michael Jordan, and the Chicago Bulls in four games. Following the season, Pressey was traded to the San Antonio Spurs.

Draft picks

Roster

Regular season

Season standings

z - clinched division title
y - clinched division title
x - clinched playoff spot

Record vs. opponents

Game log

|-style="background:#fcc;"
| 1 || November 3, 1989 || @ Boston
| L 114–127
|Ricky Pierce (35)
|
|
| Boston Garden14,890
| 0-1
|-style="background:#bbffbb;"
| 2 || November 4, 1989 || @ Philadelphia
| W 102–96
|Paul Pressey (21)
|
|
| The Spectrum13,893
| 1–1
|-style="background:#bbffbb;"
| 3 || November 7, 1989 || Boston
| W 106–100
|Fred Roberts (26)
|
|
| Bradley Center15,079
| 2–1
|-style="background:#bbffbb;"
| 4 || November 9, 1989 || Seattle
| W 155–154 5OT
|Ricky Pierce (36)
|Randy Breuer, Ben Coleman (9)
|Jay Humphries (10)
| Bradley Center14,012
| 3–1
|-style="background:#fcc;"
| 5 || November 11, 1989 || Philadelphia
| L 96–104
|
|
|
| Bradley Center17,465
| 3–2
|-style="background:#bbffbb;"
| 6 || November 14, 1989 || San Antonio
| W 108–97
|
|
|
| Bradley Center14,120
| 4–2
|-style="background:#bbffbb;"
| 7 || November 16, 1989 || Orlando
| W 132–113
|
|
|
| Bradley Center13,298
| 5–2
|-style="background:#fcc;"
| 8 || November 17, 1989 || @ Detroit
| L 79–106
|
|
|
| The Palace of Auburn Hills21,454
| 5-3
|-style="background:#fcc;"
| 9 || November 21, 1989 || @ Washington
| L 91–97
|
|
|
| Capital Centre11,721
| 5-4
|-style="background:#bbffbb;"
| 10 || November 22, 1989 || Atlanta
| W 118–100
|
|
|
| Bradley Center15,124
| 6–4
|-style="background:#fcc;"
| 11 || November 25, 1989 || @ New York
| L 108–125
|
|
|
| Madison Square Garden18,212
| 6-5
|-style="background:#fcc;"
| 12 || November 27, 1989 || Indiana
| L 97–101
|
|
|
| Bradley Center15,124
| 6–6
|-style="background:#bbffbb;"
| 13 || November 29, 1989 || @ L. A. Clippers
| W 117–103
|
|
|
| Los Angeles Memorial Sports Arena12,306
| 7–6
|-style="background:#fcc;"
| 14 || November 30, 1989 || @ Denver
| L 102–103
|
|
|
| McNichols Sports Arena8,727
| 7–7

|-style="background:#fcc;"
| 15 || December 2, 1989 || @ Golden State
| L 98–101
|
|
|
| Oakland-Alameda County Coliseum Arena15,025
| 7–8
|-style="background:#fcc;"
| 16 || December 5, 1989 || @ Sacramento
| L 103–118
|
|
|
| ARCO Arena17,014
| 7–9
|-style="background:#fcc;"
| 17 || December 8, 1989 || @ Phoenix
| L 103–118
|
|
|
| Arizona Veterans Memorial Coliseum12,409
| 7–10
|-style="background:#bbffbb;"
| 19 || December 12, 1989 || Orlando
| W 106–103
|
|
|
| Bradley Center14,276
| 9–10
|-style="background:#bbffbb;"
| 24 || December 22, 1989 || Cleveland
| W 112–100
|
|
|
| Bradley Center17,854
| 11–13

|-style="background:#bbffbb;"
| 36 || January 16, 1990 || Golden State
| W 134–126
|
|
|
| Bradley Center18,633
| 20–16
|-style="background:#bbffbb;"
| 41 || January 24, 1990 || @ Seattle
| W 119–112
|
|
|
| Seattle Center Coliseum10,903
| 24–17
|-style="background:#fcc;"
| 42 || January 26, 1990 || @ L. A. Lakers
| L 91–100
|
|
|
| Great Western Forum17,505
| 24–18
|-style="background:#fcc;"
| 43 || January 27, 1990 || @ Utah
| L 96–144
|
|
|
| Salt Palace12,616
| 24–19

|-style="background:#bbffbb;"
| 52 || February 20, 1990 || New Jersey
| W 106–103
|
|
|
| Bradley Center14,065
| 29–23
|-style="background:#bbffbb;"
| 53 || February 22, 1990 || Dallas
| W 109–97
|
|
|
| Bradley Center15,136
| 30–23

Playoffs

|- align="center" bgcolor="#ffcccc"
| 1
| April 27
| @ Chicago
| L 97–111
| Alvin Robertson (22)
| Brad Lohaus (7)
| Jay Humphries (12)
| Chicago Stadium18,676
| 0–1
|- align="center" bgcolor="#ffcccc"
| 2
| April 29
| @ Chicago
| L 101–109
| Paul Pressey (25)
| Greg Anderson (10)
| Paul Pressey (12)
| Chicago Stadium18,676
| 0–2
|- align="center" bgcolor="#ccffcc"
| 3
| May 1
| Chicago
| W 119–112
| Alvin Robertson (38)
| Alvin Robertson (8)
| Paul Pressey (12)
| Bradley Center18,575
| 1–2
|- align="center" bgcolor="#ffcccc"
| 4
| May 3
| Chicago
| L 86–110
| Alvin Robertson (20)
| Lohaus, Anderson (8)
| Alvin Robertson (4)
| Bradley Center18,633
| 1–3
|-

Player statistics

Season

Playoffs

Awards and records
 Ricky Pierce, NBA Sixth Man of the Year Award
 Alvin Robertson, NBA All-Defensive Second Team

Transactions

Trades

Free Agents

Player Transactions Citation:

References

See also
 1989-90 NBA season

Milwaukee Bucks seasons
1989 in sports in Wisconsin
Milwaukee Bucks
Milwaukee